The Adrar Sirwa, also spelled Adrar Siroua, is a peak in the Anti-Atlas mountain range.

References

Atlas Mountains
Stratovolcanoes
Mountains of Morocco
Volcanoes of Morocco